Felis margarita thinobia, known as the Turkestan sand cat, Arabian sand cat, and Pakistan sand cat, is a sand cat subspecies native to deserts in the Arabian Peninsula, Iran, Pakistan and Central Asia.

Taxonomy
In 1926, Russian zoologist Sergey Ognev described a sand cat collected in the Karakum Desert in Turkmenistan under the name Eremaelurus thinobius. In 1938, British zoologist Reginald Innes Pocock considered this specimen a species under the name Felis thinobius. Later he considered it a subspecies of the sand cat, which to date is widely recognised.

In 1974, F. m. scheffeli was described based on seven specimens from Pakistan's Nushki desert.
In 1976, F. m. harrisoni was described based on a single specimen captured in Oman.

In 2017, the Cat Classification Task Force of the Cat Specialist Group subordinated both F. m. harrisoni and F. m. scheffeli to F. m. thinobia.

Characteristics
Sand cat specimens collected in the Karakum Desert in Turkestan were described as darker and greyer in fur colour than the Saharan sand cat (F. m. margarita), with less pronounced markings and only 2–3 tail rings. Specimens from Pakistan were more strongly marked, had shorter carnassials and a less expanded occiput than ones from Turkestan. Later studies confirmed that F. m. thinobia is larger in size with greyer fur and fewer markings than F. m. margarita.

Distribution and habitat
In the Arabian Peninsula, sand cats were recorded in Saudi Arabia's Mahazat as-Sayd Protected Area and in the country's Najd region.
In the United Arab Emirates, sand cats were observed in the Al-Ain Region, Abu Dhabi and recorded by camera-traps in Baynouna Protected Area.
A record in Oman's Umm al Samim area dates to the 1970s.

In the Near East, sand cats were radio-collared and tracked in Israel's Arabah Valley, observed in a Jordanian desert, in the central Syrian desert near Palmyra, and captured in Iraq's Najaf desert.
In Iran, sand cats were recorded in sandy deserts of Abbas’abad Wildlife Reserve, Kavir National Park, Petergan Rural District, and in Sistan and Baluchestan Province.

In Central Asia, sand cats were captured in the east of the Karakum Desert in the early 1920s, and in the 1950s also in Turkmenistan, Uzbekistan and Kazakhstan for the fur trade.
In the southern Kyzylkum Desert, sand cats were recorded by camera-traps in 2013.

Conservation

In 2003, the status of the Pakistan sand cat population was assessed as Critically Endangered during a workshop for the national 'Red List of Pakistan's Mammals'. However, a survey targeting the sand cat population in the country has not been carried out since the 1960s.

In captivity
Since the mid 1960s, sand cats were captured in Pakistan for trade and export to Europe, until the Pakistani government rejected issuing of permits in 1974.
In 2013, a study revealed that the captive sand cat population kept in European zoos is descended from 18 founders.

References

External links
 Elusive Arabian sand cat spotted after 10 years' disappearance (New Scientist)

thinobia
Mammals of the Arabian Peninsula
Mammals of Central Asia
Mammals of Pakistan
Mammals described in 1926